The Vanuatu women's national handball team is the national handball team of Vanuatu.

Oceania Handball Nations Cup record

References

External links
 Profile on International Handball Federation webpage
 Oceania Continent Handball Federation webpage

Women's national handball teams
Women's handball in Vanuatu